1911 Revolution is a Chinese television series based on the events of the Xinhai Revolution, which brought an end to imperial rule in China in 1911. It was first broadcast on CCTV-1 during prime time on 27 September 2011. It was specially produced to mark the 100th anniversary of the Xinhai Revolution.

Plot
The series follows a chronology of the major events that happened throughout the life of Sun Yat-sen. It includes, among other events, the formation of the Tongmenghui, the Wuchang Uprising, the fall of the Qing dynasty, the establishment of the Republic of China, Yuan Shikai's rise and fall from power, and the National Protection War.

Cast

 Ma Shaohua as Sun Yat-sen
 Yao Jude as Huang Xing
 Zhang Qiuge as Yuan Shikai
 Wen Qing as Soong Ching-ling
 Zhang Beishi as Song Jiaoren
 Brenda Wang as Chen Cuifen
 Stephanie Siao as Qiu Jin
 Bo Cen as Hu Hanmin
 Guan Danli as Lu Muzhen
 Yu Rongguang as Cai E
 Yu Xiaohui as Ni Guizhen
 Liu Boying as Song Jiashu
 Liu Yue as Li Zhongshi
 Nige Mutu as Xu Shichang
 Di Wanchen as Li Yuanhong
 Shi Liang as Zhang Zhenwu
 Ma Guangze as Wang Jingwei
 Ma Heyao as Chen Bijun
 Luo Yinan as Fang Junying
 Wang Nan as Cai Yuanpei
 Gao Yu as Liao Zhongkai
 Wang Yadi as Chen Qimei
 Zhang Ruihan as Zhang Ji
 Yang Junyong as Yuan Keding
 Ji Shuai as Ma Xiang
 Bai Yao as Yin Weijun
 Wang Zhuoya as Yin Ruizhi
 Yang Fan as Sun Wu
 Sun Leiyan as Ju Zheng
 Wan Yifu as Yuan Kewen
 Ma Xiaowei as Zhang Taiyan
 Zhang Shihui as Tan Renfeng
 Lu Lin as Zhu Zhixin
 Zhao Kai as Liu Kuiyi
 Li Xiaofeng as Chen Tianhua
 Lin Yijie as Yu Peilun
 Fan Yulin as Xu Xilin
 Hao Xiaodong as Su Manzhu
 Li Weiwei as Soong Ai-ling
 Yu Qian as Wu Zhaolin
 Guo Wenxue as Xiong Xiling
 Wang Zhe as Feng Guozhang
 Wang Wei as Duan Qirui
 Wang Kaiyang as Lu Xun
 Ye Jin as Hu Daonan
 Zhao Lixin as Yang Du
 Li Hongwei as Zhao Bingjun
 Zhang Su as Liu Shipei
 Lu Hao as Huang Kan
 Zhang Bo as Tang Shouqian
 Sun Ge as Xiaofengxian
 He Hongshan as Yuan Shikai's sixth wife
 Zheng Tianyong as Yikuang
 Chen Zhou as Ni Sichong
 Wang Maolei as Zaifeng
 Zhou Qing as Empress Dowager Longyu
 Fan Xiaoyang as Liang Qichao
 Dong Zhao as Zhang Zhidong
 Zhang Chunlin as Tie Liang
 Ma Wenbo as Tie Zhong
 Wang Guojing as En Ming
 Yoneoka as Tōten Miyazaki

Production
The Publicity Department of the Communist Party of China marketed 1911 Revolution as an important tribute to celebrate the 100th anniversary of the 1911 Revolution. Produced by Tianjin Television and the Publicity Department of the CPC Tianjin Municipal Committee, the series started its planning work in 2008 and completed its preparations by the second half of 2009. A press conference was held on 24 October 2010 at the Great Hall of the People in Beijing to announce the series. Shooting began on the following day in Tianjin and wrapped up on 15 March 2011. Li Wei, the director for the series, mentioned that the plot would be as historically accurate as possible, and that there is historical evidence to support how the historical figures (over 200 of them) in the series are portrayed.

See also
 1911 (film)
 Towards the Republic

References

External links
  1911 Revolution official website
  1911 Revolution on Sina.com

2011 Chinese television series debuts
Television series set in the Qing dynasty
Chinese period television series
Chinese documentary television series
Cultural depictions of Sun Yat-sen
Television series set in the 1910s
Works about the 1911 Revolution